Brian Darnell Oliver (born June 1, 1968) is an American-Italian retired professional basketball player. A 6' 4" (1.93 m) and 210 lb (95 kg) shooting guard out of Georgia Tech, he was selected by the Philadelphia 76ers of the NBA in the second round (32nd pick overall) of the 1990 NBA draft. Oliver played four years in the league, mainly with the 76ers from 1990–1992 and two brief stints with the Washington Bullets (1994–95) and Atlanta Hawks (1997–98). His best year as a pro came during his rookie year with the Sixers, appearing in 73 games and averaging 3.8 ppg.

Brian Oliver, along with Dennis Scott and Kenny Anderson, formed the famed trio "Lethal Weapon 3" which led the GT basketball team to the final four in 1990.  In 1999, he teamed with Manu Ginóbili, Brent Scott and Sydney Johnson to earn promotion for Viola Reggio Calabria from the Italian 2nd Division to the Italian First Division.

References

External links
NBA stats
Eurobasket.com Profile

1968 births
Living people
African-American basketball players
American expatriate basketball people in Greece
American expatriate basketball people in Israel
American expatriate basketball people in Italy
American men's basketball players
Atlanta Hawks players
Georgia Tech Yellow Jackets men's basketball players
Italian men's basketball players
McDonald's High School All-Americans
Parade High School All-Americans (boys' basketball)
Philadelphia 76ers draft picks
Philadelphia 76ers players
Rockford Lightning players
Shooting guards
Washington Bullets players
Basketball players from Chicago
21st-century African-American people
20th-century African-American sportspeople